Assif Tsahar (born Israel, June 11, 1969) is an Israeli tenor saxophonist and bass clarinetist. He has lived in New York City since 1990.

He has performed with Cecil Taylor, Butch Morris, William Parker, Mat Maneri, Hamid Drake, Peter Kowald, Susie Ibarra, Rashied Ali, Warren Smith, Wilbur Morris, Le Quan Ninh, John Tchicai, Fred Anderson, Rob Brown, Roy Campbell, Gerald Cleaver, Agusti Fernandez, Ken Vandermark, Kent Kessler, Joe Daley, Herb Robertson, Cuong Vu, Chris Jonas, Ori Kaplan, Oscar Noriega, Roman Stolyar, Alex Harding, Steve Swell, Cooper-Moore, and Tom Abbs

He founded the label Hopscotch Records in 1999. In 2006 he opened the music club Levontin7 with Daniel Sarid in Tel Aviv.

Discography

As leader or co-leader
 Shekhina (Eremite, 1996)
 Ein Sof (Silkheart, 1997)
 Home Cookin (Hopscotch, 1998)
 The Hollow World (Hopscotch, 1999)
 Open Systems (Marge, 2001)
 Soul Bodies, vol. 1 (Ayler, 2001) 
 Ma: Live at the Fundacio Juan Miro (Hopscotch, 2002) 
 Come Sunday (Hopscotch, 2003) 
 America (Hopscotch, 2003)
 JAM (Hopscotch, 2003) 
 Lost Brother (Hopscotch, 2005)
 Code Re(a)d (Hopscotch, 2011)

Digital Primitives
Digital Primitives (Hopscotch, 2007)
Hum Crackle & Pop (Hopscotch, 2009)

As sideman
With Rashied Ali
Deals, Ideas & Ideals (Hopscotch, 2001)
With Rob Brown
Scratching the Surface (CIMP, 1998)
With Andy McWain
Resemblance (Fuller Street Music, 2008)
Starfish (Fuller Street Music, 2003)
With William Parker
Sunrise in the Tone World (AUM Fidelity, 1995)
Mass for the Healing of the World (Black Saint, 1998 [2003])
With Hugh Ragin
Feel the Sunshine (Justin Time, 2002)Revelation'' (Justin Time, 2004)

References

External links
Hopscotch Records website

Avant-garde jazz musicians
Jazz tenor saxophonists
Bass clarinetists
1969 births
Living people
CIMP artists
21st-century saxophonists
21st-century clarinetists